Nischal or Nischol is a surname of Indian origin. It is also a given name used in India and Nepal.

Surname 
 Dega Nischal, Indian cricketer
 Paul Nischal, a politician from the United Kingdom
 Navin Nischol, Indian actor
 Praveen Nischol, Indian producer, director and writer

Given name
 Nischal Basnet, a Nepalese film personality

Indian surnames
Punjabi tribes